House at 244 Park Avenue is a historic home located at Huntington in Suffolk County, New York. It is a four bay, saltbox profile dwelling with clapboard sheathing and a brick foundation. It was built about 1830 and features a shed roof porch on square columns. The house is located on the southwest corner of Park Avenue and Mill Lane across from the Huntington Hospital Parking Garage.

It was added to the National Register of Historic Places in 1985.

References

Houses on the National Register of Historic Places in New York (state)
Houses completed in 1830
Houses in Suffolk County, New York
1830 establishments in New York (state)
National Register of Historic Places in Suffolk County, New York